

References

Björk